The 1995 Proton Cars World Darts Championship was the second world championship organised by the World Darts Council (now the Professional Darts Corporation). It was held between 27 December 1994 and 2 January 1995.

Phil Taylor emerged as champion, overcoming John Lowe 5–4 in the semi-final before beating Rod Harrington 6–2 in the final to claim his first WDC World Championship title, and his third World Championship in all.

Seeds
 Dennis Priestley
 Rod Harrington
 Peter Evison
 Phil Taylor
 Bob Anderson
 Kevin Spiolek
 Jamie Harvey
 Alan Warriner

Prize money

Results

Group stage

Group A

26 December

27 December

28 December

Group B

26 December

27 December
{| style="text-align:center"
|-
!width=223|
!width=100|
!width=223|
|-
|align=right| 86.70 Larry Butler 
|3 – 1
|align=left|  Keith Deller 83.96
|}

28 December

Group C

26 December

27 December

28 December

Group D

26 December

27 December

28 December

Group E

26 December

27 December

28 December

Group F

26 December

27 December

28 December

Group G

26 December

27 December

28 December

Group H

26 December

27 December

28 December

Knockout stagesThird place play-off:  (3) Peter Evison 84.95 2 – 4  John Lowe''' 82.81

References

PDC World Darts Championships
WDC World Darts Championship
WDC World Darts Championship
WDC World Darts Championship
WDC World Darts Championship
Sport in Essex
Purfleet